The Mini-Munsters is an animated one-hour telefilm that was aired as part of The ABC Saturday Superstar Movie in 1973, and was based on the characters from The Munsters. Of the original series' cast, only Al Lewis (Grandpa) lent his voice to the special.

Plot
The cartoon begins when some gangsters are asking directions to an oil refinery. After Herman gives them directions, the gasoline company president is seen bound and gagged in the back of the gangsters' car. Soon after, a messenger bat arrives from Transylvania and the Munsters are informed their cousins Igor and Lucretia are coming to visit them. They go to the airport, where the cousins are found waiting for them on the luggage carousel. Initially Eddie (now a teenager) wants nothing to do with his cousins, at first thinking that they are younger than him, but since they all like playing rock music, they form a band. Herman is annoyed by the music the Mini-Munsters play, so they offer to play their music at school. Since Herman had promised to buy Eddie a car, they go buy a used hearse. When Eddie asks if there is enough room in the back of the hearse for their instruments, Herman stretches it out in the back, and assures them there is. They discover that the old hearse is haunted by the funeral director who owned it when he was alive. Grandpa adds an invention that allows for the car to run on music when it runs out of gas. The device becomes popular, and the gangsters, who have taken over a gasoline company, are infuriated.  The gangster boss challenges the Munsters to a race with his sports car, which the Munsters win. It seems the faster Eddie, Lucretia and Igor play their music, the faster the hearse travels. When they beat the gangster boss in a race at the park Grand Prix course, the gangsters capture the Munsters' pet dragon Spot by tricking the family into leaving their house for an award ceremony, which Herman learns was not real. The gangsters then threaten to harm Spot if Grandpa does not destroy his invention. The young Munsters find Spot and thwart the gangsters by getting Spot back.

Cast
 Richard Long - Herman Munster
 Cynthia Adler - Lily Munster
 Al Lewis - Grandpa Dracula
 Bobby Diamond - Eddie Munster
 Henry Gibson - Mr. Grundy
 Ron Feinberg - Various characters
 Stuart Getz - Various characters

Production

Development
This movie was created with hopes of developing an animated spin-off of the original Munsters series, but it was not picked up as a series. The movie aired on October 27, 1973, as an hour-long special, however a shorter, half-hour version was aired in the 1980s.

References

External links
 
 Toon Tracker: The ABC Saturday Superstar Movies (Page 3)

The Munsters films
1973 television films
1973 films
The ABC Saturday Superstar Movie
Films directed by Gerard Baldwin